Tang-e Jafar (also Romanized as Tang-e Ja‘far and Tang Ja‘far; also known as Tangay Jafar) is a village in Chah Salem Rural District, in the Central District of Omidiyeh County, Khuzestan Province, Iran. At the 2006 census, its population was 244, in 37 families.

References 

Populated places in Omidiyeh County